The 1916–17 Swiss International Ice Hockey Championship was the second edition of the international ice hockey championship in Switzerland. Seven teams participated in the championship, which was won by HC Les Avants, who defeated HC Servette A in the final.

First round

Group 1

Group 2

Final 
 HC Les Avants - HC Servette A 5:1

External links 
Swiss Ice Hockey Federation – All-time results

National
Swiss International Ice Hockey Championship seasons